Sid C. Attard (born September 29, 1950, Birkirkara, Malta) is a Canada-based thoroughbred horse racing trainer. Members of his family emigrated to Canada in the 1960s, and his older brothers Joseph and Tino became racehorse trainers. Larry became one of the top jockeys in the country and a member of the Canadian Horse Racing Hall of Fame.

A trainer since 1977, Attard is based at Toronto's Woodbine Racetrack, where he has led all trainers in wins four times. On  December 6, 2008 he won his 1,600th career race with Forever Gleaming. On November 14/2010 he won his 1,700th career race in the Autumn Stakes with Stunning Stag. In February 2011, the Brampton Guardian announced that Sid would be a 2011 inductee of the Brampton Sports Hall Of Fame. 

A resident of Bramalea, a neighbourhood in Brampton, Ontario, Attard and his wife Janice have three children. Their sons Paul and Jamie have followed in their father's footsteps and are trainers at Woodbine Racetrack.

References
 Sid Attard at the NTRA
 Profile of Sid Attard at Woodbine Media Guide

1950 births
Living people
Canadian horse trainers
Canadian people of Maltese descent
Maltese emigrants to Canada
Naturalized citizens of Canada
Animal sportspeople from Ontario
People from Birkirkara